Bart Hendricks (born August 30, 1978) is a former American and Canadian football quarterback. He played for the Edmonton Eskimos of the Canadian Football League. He played college football at Boise State.

Early life
Hendricks attended Hug High School in Reno, Nevada.

College career
During his career at Boise State, Hendricks completed 650 of 1,142 passes for 9,030 yards and 78 touchdowns. As a senior in 2000, he led the nation is passing touchdowns with 35. In his final college game, he was named the MVP of the 2000 Humanitarian Bowl.

See also
 List of NCAA major college football yearly passing leaders

References

1978 births
Living people
American football quarterbacks
Canadian football quarterbacks
Boise State Broncos football players
Frankfurt Galaxy players
Edmonton Elks players
Boise Burn players